Antigonish is a provincial electoral district in Nova Scotia, Canada, that elects one member of the Nova Scotia House of Assembly. It has existed since 1867 and is one of only four Nova Scotian districts that has existed continuously since Canadian Confederation.

The district includes the community of Antigonish and the surrounding Antigonish County. It is bordered by Pictou East to the west, Guysborough-Sheet Harbour to its south, the Strait of Canso to the east, and the Northumberland Strait to the north.

With the electoral boundary changes announced on September 12, 2012, the area east of Tracadie River is moved to the new riding of Guysborough–Eastern Shore–Tracadie.

Geography

Members of the Legislative Assembly
This riding has elected the following Members of the Legislative Assembly:

Election results

1867 general election

1871 general election

1874 general election

1878 general election

1882 general election

1882 special election 

|-

|Conservative
|Charles B. Whidden
|align="right"|1225
|align="right"|
|align="right"|
|-

|Liberal
|C. C. Gregrory
|align="right"|884
|align="right"|
|align="right"|
|}

1886 general election

1887 special election 

|-

|Liberal
|Angus MacGillivray
|align="right"|Acclamation
|align="right"|
|align="right"|
|}

1890 general election

1891 special election 

|-

|Conservative
|C. P. Chisholm
|align="right"|933
|align="right"|
|align="right"|
|-

|Liberal
|J. J. Cameron
|align="right"|916
|align="right"|
|align="right"|
|}

1894 general election

1895 special election 

|-

|Liberal
|A. MacGillivray
|align="right"|1312
|align="right"|
|align="right"|
|-

|Liberal-Conservative
|D. A. Fraser
|align="right"|1016
|align="right"|
|align="right"|
|}

1897 general election

1901 general election

1903 special election 

|-

|Liberal
|Fred Robert Trotter
|align="right"|
|align="right"|
|align="right"|
|}

1906 general election

1911 general election

1913 special election 

|-

|Liberal
|John Stanfield O'Brien
|align="right"|
|align="right"|
|align="right"|
|-
|}

1916 general election

1920 general election

1923 special election 

|-

|Liberal
|William Chisholm
|align="right"|
|align="right"|
|align="right"|
|}

1925 general election

1928 general election

1933 general election

1937 general election

1941 general election

1942 special election 

|-

|Liberal
|John Patrick Gorman
|align="right"|2496
|align="right"|
|align="right"|
|-

|Conservative
|Russell Cunningham
|align="right"|1099
|align="right"|
|align="right"|
|}

1945 general election

1949 general election

1953 general election

1956 general election

1960 general election

1963 general election

1967 general election

1970 general election

1974 general election

1978 general election

1981 general election

1984 general election

1988 general election

1993 general election

1998 general election

1999 general election

2003 general election

2006 general election

2009 general election

2009 by-election 

|New Democrat
|Maurice Smith
|align="right"|3,310
|align="right"|41.02
|align="right"|+5.84

|Progressive Conservative
|Darren Thompson
|align="right"|2,855
|align="right"|35.38
|align="right"|-2.70

|Liberal
|Miles Tompkins
|align="right"|1,830
|align="right"|22.68
|align="right"|-2.38

|}

2013 general election 

|-

|Liberal
|Randy Delorey
|align="right"| 3882
|align="right"| 42.78
|align="right"| +20.10
|-

|Progressive Conservative
|Darren Thompson
|align="right"| 2868
|align="right"| 31.61
|align="right"| -3.77
|-

|New Democrat
|Maurice Smith
|align="right"| 2324
|align="right"| 25.61
|align="right"| -15.41

|}

2017 general election

2021 general election

References

Elections Nova Scotia, Summary Results from 1867 to 2011. Retrieved December 1, 2013.
Elections Nova Scotia, Complete Results and Statistics (August 5, 2003). Retrieved December 1, 2013.
Elections Nova Scotia, Complete Results and Statistics (June 13, 2006). Retrieved December 1, 2013.

External links
 CBC: 2013 riding profile

Antigonish, Nova Scotia
Nova Scotia provincial electoral districts